Tahiti Nights is a 1944 American comedy film directed by Will Jason and written by Lillie Hayward. The film stars Jinx Falkenburg, Dave O'Brien, Mary Treen, Florence Bates, Cy Kendall and Eddie Bruce. The film was released on December 28, 1944, by Columbia Pictures.

Plot

Cast           
Jinx Falkenburg as Luana
Dave O'Brien as Jack
Mary Treen as Mata
Florence Bates as Queen Liliha
Cy Kendall as Chief Enoka
Eddie Bruce as Chopstick / Cyril Stonewall
The Vagabonds as Comic Musicians
Hilo Hattie as Temata
Pedro de Cordoba as Tonga
Carole Mathews as Betty Lou
Harry Owens as Harry Owens

References

External links
 

1944 films
American comedy films
1944 comedy films
Columbia Pictures films
Films directed by Will Jason
American black-and-white films
1940s English-language films
1940s American films